German submarine U-930 was a Type VIIC/41 U-boat of Nazi Germany's Kriegsmarine during World War II.

She was ordered on 2 April 1942, and was laid down on 20 April 1943, at Neptun Werft AG, Rostock, as yard number 517. She was commissioned under the command of Oberleutnant zur See Kurt Mohr on 6 December 1944.

Design
German Type VIIC/41 submarines were preceded by the heavier Type VIIC submarines. U-930 had a displacement of  when at the surface and  while submerged. She had two shafts and two  propellers.

U-930 was fitted with five  torpedo tubes (four fitted at the bow and one at the stern), fourteen torpedoes, one  SK C/35 naval gun, (220 rounds), one  Flak M42 and two  C/30 anti-aircraft guns. The boat had a complement of between forty-four and fifty-two.

Service history
U-930 did not participate in any war patrols before surrendering at Bergen, Norway, on 9 May 1945.

On 30 May 1945, U-930 was transferred to Lisahally where she would wait nearly seven months for her final fate. Of the 156 U-boats that eventually surrendered to the Allied forces at the end of the war, U-930 was one of 116 selected to take part in Operation Deadlight.

See also
 Battle of the Atlantic

References

Bibliography

German Type VIIC/41 submarines
U-boats commissioned in 1944
U-boats sunk in 1945
World War II submarines of Germany
1944 ships
World War II shipwrecks in the Atlantic Ocean
Ships built in Rostock
Maritime incidents in May 1945
Operation Deadlight